Bug is a 1975 American horror film in Panavision, directed by Jeannot Szwarc and written by William Castle and Thomas Page, from Page's novel The Hephaestus Plague (1973). It was the last film Castle was involved in before his death in 1977. The film starred Bradford Dillman, Joanna Miles and Richard Gilliland.

Plot
An earthquake releases a species of previously unknown insect which can create fires by rubbing their legs together. Eventually however, most of the bugs die because they cannot survive in the low air pressure on the Earth's surface. 

After the wife of a scientist dies when one of the insects crawls in her hair, Professor James Parmiter keeps one alive in a pressure chamber. He becomes obsessed with the insect and successfully breeds the new species with a modern cockroach, creating a breed of intelligent, flying super-cockroaches. 

Parmiter goes into seclusion at a farm after seeing his creation and gaining the ability to communicate with the bugs.

Cast
 Bradford Dillman as Professor James Parmiter
 Joanna Miles as Carrie Parmiter
 Richard Gilliland as Gerald Metbaum
 Jamie Smith-Jackson as Norma Tacker
 Alan Fudge as Professor Mark Ross
 Jesse Vint as Tom Tacker
 Patty McCormack as Sylvia Ross
 Brendan Dillon as Charlie
 Frederic Downs as Henry Tacker
 James Greene as Reverend Kern
 Jim Poyner as Kenny Tacker

Production

The living room and kitchen sets from The Brady Bunch were reused in this film, although the living room set was rearranged slightly to a smaller footprint. Aside from a paint job, the kitchen set was otherwise unaltered.

It was based on the book The Hephaestus Plague by Thomas Page.

It was writer William Castle's last film.

Reception
, Hoiwever, the sci-fi review site Moria was kinder to the movie. calling it Swzarc's best film. It noted that the moview was better than expected, and the first part of the movie at least maintains scientific credibility. The also praised the lead actor's performance.

Variety found the film static and lacking interest. TV Guide liked the music, and found the overall techincial credits good, but overall found the movie mediorce.

Entertainment Weekly gave the film a C, while Leonard Maltin gave the movie two stars. 

The New York Times found the movie "sickening" and felt it deserved a harsher rating than PG. 

The film made just over eight million dollars world wide.

See also
 List of American films of 1975

References

External links
 
 
 
 
 
 

1975 films
1975 horror films
1970s monster movies
1970s science fiction horror films
American monster movies
American natural horror films
American science fiction horror films
1970s English-language films
Films about insects
Fictional cockroaches
Films based on American horror novels
Films directed by Jeannot Szwarc
Films scored by Charles Fox
Films set in California
Paramount Pictures films
1970s American films